is a Japanese football player. He plays for Gamba Osaka.

Playing career
Kei Ishikawa joined to J1 League club; Vegalta Sendai in 2011. In March 2013, he moved to Sony Sendai, in 2014 he moved to Blaublitz Akita. In 2015, he back to Vegalta Sendai.

Club statistics
Updated to 23 February 2018.

References

External links
Profile at Tochigi SC
Profile at Vegalta Sendai

1993 births
Living people
Association football people from Niigata Prefecture
Japanese footballers
J1 League players
J2 League players
J3 League players
Japan Football League players
Vegalta Sendai players
Sony Sendai FC players
Blaublitz Akita players
Tochigi SC players
Sagan Tosu players
Gamba Osaka players
Association football goalkeepers